Andrew MacDonald (January 2, 1930 – May 24, 1985) was an American football player and coach. He served as the head football coach at Northern Arizona University (NAU) from 1965 to 1968, compiling a record of 22–17–1. MacDonald also was an assistant coach for the Seattle Seahawks and Buffalo Bills of the National Football League (NFL). He played college football for Central Michigan University (CMU), where he was a Little All-American at quarterback.

Head coaching record

References

1930 births
1985 deaths
American football quarterbacks
Buffalo Bills coaches
Central Michigan Chippewas football players
Northern Arizona Lumberjacks football coaches
Players of American football from Flint, Michigan
Seattle Seahawks coaches
Sportspeople from Flint, Michigan